Liaoning Zhongda Aluminium Flying Eagles is a Chinese professional women's basketball club in Liaoning, playing in the Women's Chinese Basketball Association (WCBA). Liaoning Zhongda Aluminum Co. has been the team's corporate sponsor since 2015.

From 2005 to 2015, the team was known as Liaoning Hengye Golden Leopards and sponsored by Liaoning Hengye Group. Before 2005 it was known as Liaoning Big Dipper.

Season-by-season records

Current players

Notable former players

 Valerie Muoneke (2004)
 Larissa Anderson (2004)
 Janell Burse (2004–05)
 Kim Gipson (2005–06)
 Tangela Smith (2008–09)
 Kara Braxton (2009–11, 2015–16)
 Ruth Riley (2011–12)
 Yelena Leuchanka (2012–13)
 DeMya Walker (2013)
 Jayne Appel (2013–14)
 Janel McCarville (2014–15)
 Kelsey Bone (2016–17)
 Elizabeth Williams (2017–18)
 Kiyomi Fujiu (2010–11)
 Wei Yu-chun (2017–18)
 Wang Ling (2002–09)
 Chen Xiaoli (2002–13)
 Ma Zengyu (2002–14)
 Zhang Wei (2004–07, 2009–12)
 Zhang Yu (2004–11, 2012–13)
 Yang Banban (2005–06, 2008–14)

References 

 
Women's Chinese Basketball Association teams
Sport in Shenyang
Anshan